Enköping is a locality and the seat of Enköping Municipality, Uppsala County, Sweden with 30,000 inhabitants in 2018.

Geography 
Enköping is situated near Lake Mälaren, about 78 km west of Stockholm.
A comparably large number of Swedish cities are located in the vicinity of Enköping. The municipal slogan is therefore "Sweden's Closest City". This expression was created in 1965 when it was discovered by a local business that within a radius of 120 kilometers, one finds 38 Swedish cities and a third of Sweden's population.

History 

Near Enköping, there is some of the best preserved rock art from the Bronze Age present in central Sweden. The city of Enköping itself dates its history back to the 13th century but the city itself did not emerge until about 1250. Enköping was then as now situated by the rich farmlands close to lake Mälaren, leading to a wealthy rural population. The city has also always been a major crossroads for commerce, and excellent communications signify the city even today: The Mälar Railline (Mälarbanan) and the E18 highway provide ample means of travelling to the nearby major cities of Stockholm and Västerås. The city has several manufacturing industries, a hospital and the Swedish Armed Forces command and control an army electronic warfare centre Ledningsregementet (LedR).

Notable people
Amelia Andersdotter
Snoh Aalegra, singer
Elin Lanto, singer
Lars (archbishop) is buried in the monastery there.

Sports
The following sports clubs are located in Enköping:

 Enköpings SK
 Enköpings RK

Twin towns – sister cities

Enköping is twinned with:

 Santa Rosa, Laguna, Philippines

References

External links 
Find businesses and places in Enköping

Municipal seats of Uppsala County
Swedish municipal seats
Populated places in Uppsala County
Populated places in Enköping Municipality
Market towns in Sweden